Río Negro is a town in Baja Verapaz, Guatemala. It was the site of the Rio Negro Massacre.

References 

                                                                                                                                               

Populated places in the Baja Verapaz Department